Kristjan Sokoli (born September 24, 1991) is an Albanian-born professional American football center for the Houston Gamblers of the United States Football League (USFL). He was drafted by the Seattle Seahawks in the sixth round of the 2015 NFL Draft. He played college football at Buffalo.

High school career
Sokoli's father, Gjon, fled from Shkodër, Albania to the United States seeking political asylum around the time of the Albanian Rebellion of 1997 when Kristjan was five years old. During the period of economic instability in Albania, Gjon worked in monetary exchange. When Gjon first arrived in the United States, he made $45 per day as a maintenance worker in an apartment complex, and lived in the complex's basement with other workers. Kristan's mother, Gjyste, fled to America two years after Gjon. Kristjan and his younger brother, Mark, were not able to join their parents until another two years had passed. None of the family could speak English upon arriving. Although the Sokolis are now American citizens, Kristjan still listens to Albanian music, displays an Albanian flag and speaks Albanian with his family. Edmir Sokoli, Kristjan's cousin who had come to the United States five years before Kristjan, introduced Sokoli to football when the latter was thirteen years old. Kristjan saw Edmir as a role model and looked up to him growing up.

Sokoli, known as "Moose" by his high school coach, was a three-year letterwinner in football at Bloomfield High School in Bloomfield, New Jersey where he played defensive end, left tackle, tight end, punter and placekicker. He suffered fractures on his wrist before junior and senior year of high school, which set him back a bit. He led Bloomfield to consecutive playoff berths and was named an All-Conference player. He also started for Bloomfield's basketball team and finished eighth in the state in his junior year as a discus thrower and sixth in the state his senior year. He signed a National Letter of Intent to play at the University at Buffalo in early February of his senior year.

College career
At Buffalo, Sokoli moved to the defensive line full-time. When he committed to Buffalo, he stood at 6'5" and weighed 220 pounds. By his junior year, he weighed 300 pounds. He credited this to a diet of 7,000 calories per day. He redshirted during his freshman year. By his junior year, he had become a starter on the line and was an integral part of a Buffalo pass rush which was led by future first-round draft pick linebacker Khalil Mack. Sokoli would help Buffalo to the 2013 Famous Idaho Potato Bowl that season, its second bowl appearance ever and first since the 2008 season. During his senior year, he played in the 2015 Medal of Honor Bowl. He majored in Business Administration and said that he would like to work on the New York Stock Exchange if he could not make a living playing football.

Professional career

Seattle Seahawks

Sokoli was not invited to the NFL's pre-draft scouting combine. The Seattle Seahawks selected Sokoli in the sixth round of the 2015 NFL Draft with the 214th overall pick. Despite taking two other collegiate offensive lineman in the draft, the Seahawks and offensive line coach Tom Cable discussed moving Sokoli from the defensive line to center, a position which Sokoli had never played before. He would become the first Albanian-born player to play in a National Football League game. He appeared in eight plays in the 2015 season, all on special teams in Week 16.

On August 30, 2016, Sokoli was waived by the Seahawks.

Indianapolis Colts
On September 26, 2016, Sokoli was signed to the Colts' practice squad as a defensive end. He was promoted to the active roster on December 19, 2016.

On June 15, 2017, Sokoli was waived by the Colts.

New Orleans Saints
On July 25, 2017, Sokoli signed with the New Orleans Saints as an offensive lineman. He was waived on September 2, 2017, and was signed to the practice squad the next day. He was released on September 6, 2017.

New York Giants
On December 27, 2017, Sokoli was signed to the New York Giants' practice squad. He signed a reserve/future contract with the Giants on January 1, 2018.

On August 11, 2018, Sokoli was placed on injured reserve after suffering a torn ACL.

DC Defenders
In October 2019, Sokoli was selected by the DC Defenders in the open phase of the 2020 XFL Draft. He was waived during final roster cuts on January 22, 2020.

Sokoli was assigned to the Alphas of The Spring League.

Potsdam Royals
Sokoli was signed by the Potsdam Royals in 2021.

Houston Gamblers
On March 10, 2022, Sokoli was drafted by the Houston Gamblers of the United States Football League.

NFL career statistics

Regular season

References

1991 births
Living people
American football defensive ends
American football defensive tackles
American football offensive guards
Albanian emigrants to the United States
Bloomfield High School (New Jersey) alumni
Buffalo Bulls football players
DC Defenders players
Indianapolis Colts players
New Orleans Saints players
New York Giants players
People from Bloomfield, New Jersey
People from Pukë
Players of American football from New Jersey
Seattle Seahawks players
Sportspeople from Essex County, New Jersey
The Spring League players
Houston Gamblers (2022) players
German Football League players
Sportspeople from Shkodër